OITC can stand for one of the following: 
Office of International Treasury Control
Outdoor-Indoor Transmission Class
One in the Chamber (Action Movie)